Los Teques ) is the capital of the state of Miranda and the municipality of Guaicaipuro Municipality. It is located in the capital region of north-central Venezuela. More specifically, southwest of Caracas, 10° 21' 00" N latitude and 67° 02' 30" W Greenwich, 1,169 m above sea level. It is located in the Cordillera de la Costa, on the banks of the Río San Pedro, descending from an area located in the northeast. According to the Office for National Statistics in 2016, Los Teques has a population of 252,242 people. The city is considered to be part of the agglomeration known as Greater Caracas.

History

Fifty-two years after Guaicaipuro's death, the city of Santiago de los Altos was founded in 1620, the first city after the founding of Caracas. The founders, mostly of Spanish descent, arrived with Diego de Losada, perhaps where the name came from, in honor of the founding captain of Caracas. By the 1600s, Los Teques became part of the encomienda, and the conquered lands that currently include Los Teques were allocated to Andrés González, a companion of Francisco Fajardo and Francisco Tostado de la Peña. They then passed on to Captain Juan de Ascanio and Correa de Benavides, and the tradition of ownership continued with Diego de Miquilena, who sold it in 1684 to Doña Melchora Ana Tovar Ibáñez, the widow of Captain Juan de Ascanio. Seventy years later, the same land was owned by Juan de Ascanio and Correia de Benavides, by the end of the century

From 1772 onwards, the Spanish inhabitants of San Pedro de Los Altos began to relocate to a village that had only 99 inhabitants. Five years later, they founded their new settlement as Los Teques on 21 October 1777. The new town's name was derived from the Aractoeques Carabs, an indigenous tribe that once inhabited the area. On February 13, 1927, the capital of the Miranda State was moved to this city from Petare (before being in Petare, the capital of Miranda was in Ocumare del Tuy).

Neighboring tribes that settled in the area were: Cumanagotos, Arahuacos, Tacariguas, Quiriquires, Caruaos, Tomuzas, Meregotes, Caracas. All of these peoples lived by hunting, farming, and a trade called barter. They also built houses called shacks, ranches or Troy huts using materials found in the area.

In 1781 it had 1,500 inhabitants, Alejandro de Homburg called it "a miserable town" in 1800, and in 1805 it had 2,800 inhabitants. At the end of 1810, after a long legal battle, the towns of San Pedro de los Altos and Carizal were civilly separated from the towns of Lostques to which they belonged. 

Neighboring tribes that settled in the area were the Kumanagotos, Arawacos, Tacaligua, Quirikiles, Caluaos, Tomza, Melegotes, and Caracas. All of these people made their living by hunting, farming, and a trade called bartering. They also built homes called huts, ranches, or Trojan huts from materials found in the area.

In 1781 it had a population of 1,500, while Alejandrode his Homburg called the city a "miserable city" in his 1800 and 2,800 in 1805. At the end of 1810, after a lengthy legal battle, the towns of San Pedro de los Altos and Carizal were civilly separated from the town of Rostoques, to which they belonged.

The Salesian founded San Jose High School with a long teaching career in 1912 and Francisco de Miranda High School in 1940. In 1950, the National Guard Training School was established, and in 1965, the vicar of Los Teques was elevated to a diocese, whose first bishop was Bishop Juan José Bernal, with 37 dioceses. In 1970, the National Institute of Science and Technology for the Petroleum Industry (INTEVEP) was established on land near Quebrada de la Virgen, and in 1971 the University College of the Capital Region became operational. In October 1979, Ateneo de Los Teques was established.

Geography
Temperature: Varies from 18 and 26 degrees Celsius (64.4 and 78.8 degrees Fahrenheit).

Transportation
On November 3, 2006, President Hugo Chávez inaugurated the Los Teques Metro. This metro system is connected to the Caracas Metro system.

References 

 
Cities in Miranda (state)